Spring Creek High School (SCHS) is a public secondary school in Spring Creek, Nevada, in the United States. Part of the Elko County School District, its mascot is the Spartan and the school's colors are purple, silver, and black.

History
In 1993, Spring Creek High School was built to help with the population boom in Elko County. SCHS sits in the middle of Spring Creek, Nevada, a small bedroom community just south of Elko. Spring Creek has a population just over 10,000. The first graduating class at Spring Creek High was the Class of 1996

Extracurricular activities

Athletics
The Spring Creek Spartans compete in the Northern 3A, which belongs to the NIAA.
Girls Track won the 3A State Title from 2000–2006.
Wrestling 4 time 3A State Champions

NIAA state championships 
Football - 1997,
Basketball (Girls) - 2006, 2007, 2009
Cross Country (Girls) - 1994-1997
Softball - 1996, 2000
Track and Field (Girls) - 2000, 2001, 2002, 2003, 2004, 2005, 2006
Wrestling -1996, 2004, 2005, 2006, 2007, 2008
Golf - 1997

Music

The Spring Creek music department had seen success early in the program's short history. The Marching Spartans have four state titles in the small band division (1996, 1998, 2015, 2016), marched in the Hollywood Christmas Parade in 1998, and toured the Basque country in Northern Spain and Southern France in 1999.

References

External links 
Website
Elko County School District

Educational institutions established in 1993
Public high schools in Nevada
Schools in Elko County, Nevada
School buildings completed in 1993
1993 establishments in Nevada